Carr, Riggs & Ingram, LLC is the largest certified public accounting firm headquartered in Southern Alabama. With offices located in Alabama, Florida, Georgia, Kentucky, Louisiana, Mississippi, New Mexico, North Carolina, Tennessee, and Texas, Carr, Riggs & Ingram ranks 22nd in the top 100 U.S. accounting firms and employs over 2,000 professionals.

References

External links
 Carr, Riggs & Ingram Official Website
 CRI Capital Advisors Official Website
 Level Four Advisory Services Official Website
 Auditwerx Official Website
 CRI Solutions Group Official Website
 CRI Advanced Analytics Official Website
 CRI TPA Services, LLC Official Website
 Paywerx Official Website

Accounting firms of the United States
Companies established in 1997